Epsilon Cephei, Latinized from ε Cephei, is a star in the northern constellation of Cepheus. Based upon an annual parallax shift of 38.17 mas as seen from the Earth, it is located about 85 light years from the Sun. The star is visible to the naked eye with an apparent visual magnitude of 4.18.

Properties

Physical Characteristics 
Thus it may either be an F-type main sequence star showing an abundance excess of strontium, or it could be a more evolved subgiant star. It is a Delta Scuti variable star that cycles between magnitudes 4.15 and 4.21 every 59.388 minutes. The star displays an infrared excess, indicating the presence of a debris disk with a temperature of 65 K orbiting at a radius of 62 AU. This dust has a combined mass equal to 6.6% of the Earth's mass.

Binary 
The probability of a random star being situated this close to Epsilon Cephei is about one in a million, so it is most likely physically associated. If so, then the debris disk is probably circumbinary. The fact that this companion was not detected during the Hipparcos mission may indicate its orbit has a high eccentricity. The companion star has a K-band magnitude of 7.8 and is probably of class K8–M2.

Naming
Consequently, the Chinese name for ε Cephei itself is 

References

F-type main-sequence stars
F-type subgiants
Delta Scuti variables
Circumstellar disks
Double stars
Cephei, Epsilon
Cepheus (constellation)
Durchmusterung objects
Cephei, 23
211336
109857
8494